Kieran Amparo Hayes (born 4 January 1999) is a professional footballer who plays as a forward for Northern Premier League club Grantham Town.

Career

Youth
Born in Nottingham, Hayes spent most of his youth career in Nottingham Forest.

Nottingham Forest U23
In 2019, Hayes was promoted to Nottingham Forest Under-23 team.

Loan to Truro City
Hayes was sent out on loan to Truro City for the 2019-20 season.

Truro City
In September 2020, after his loan spell with the club, Hayes joined Truro City on a permanent deal. Six months later, his contract was terminated and left the club.

United City
In March 2021, Hayes joined Philippines Football League club United City.

Grantham Town
In September 2022, Hayes joined Northern Premier League club Grantham Town.

International career
Hayes was born in England to an English father and a Filipino mother, making him eligible to represent England and the Philippines at international level.

Philippines U23
In October 2021, Hayes received a call up from Philippines U23 for the 2022 AFC U-23 Asian Cup qualification matches against South Korea U23, Singapore U23 and Timor Leste U23. He made his debut for Philippines U23 in a 3-0 defeat against South Korea U23 coming in as a substitute, replacing Sandro Reyes in the 53rd minute.

Career statistics

Club

Notes

References

1999 births
Living people
English footballers
Filipino footballers
Filipino people of English descent
Citizens of the Philippines through descent
Association football forwards
Southern Football League players
Nottingham Forest F.C. players
Truro City F.C. players
Ceres–Negros F.C. players